Bevz is a surname. Notable people with the surname include:

Mykola Bevz (born 1954), Ukrainian scientist and architect
Valery Bevz (born 1953), Ukrainian politician

See also
Bev (given name)